The acronym ICDE may refer to:
 International Council for Open and Distance Education
 IEEE International Conference on Data Engineering